The 1927 Summer Student World Championships, was the third editions of the Summer Student World Championships, were organised by the Confederation Internationale des Etudiants (CIE) and held in Rome, Italy. Held from 28 August to 4 September, 269 athletes from 15 nations competed in the sports programme including athletics, fencing, association football, swimming and tennis. Women's events were introduced for the first time, but in swimming only.

Athletics medal summary

Athletics medal table

Participating nations

References
World Student Games (Pre-Universiade) - GBR Athletics 

Summer World University Games
Athletics at the Summer Universiade
Summer Student World Championships
Summer Student World Championships
Summer Student World Championships
Multi-sport events in Italy
Sports competitions in Rome
International athletics competitions hosted by Italy
1920s in Rome
August 1927 sports events
September 1927 sports events
Athletics in Rome